Landet runt (Swedish for "around the country") is a Swedish news programme broadcast by Sveriges Television.  It covers current affairs from all over the country by using a compilation of reports from the regional news programs of SVT.  

It is broadcast on SVT1 from Gothenburg at 18.15 on Sundays. It is a sister programme to Sverige idag which is broadcast from Umeå on SVT1 on weekday evenings. 

The program has been presented by Henrik Kruusval since 2010.

External links 
 

Sveriges Television original programming
Swedish television news shows